Robertson Bay is a large, roughly triangular bay that indents the north coast of Victoria Land between Cape Barrow and Cape Adare. Discovered in 1841 by Captain James Clark Ross, Royal Navy, who named it for Dr. John Robertson, Surgeon on HMS Terror.

See also
Nameless Glacier

Bays of Victoria Land
Pennell Coast